Luka Čadež (born 9 January 1987) is a Slovenian former competitive figure skater. He is a five-time national senior medalist and competed three times at the World Junior Championships, qualifying twice for the free skate.

Programs

Results

References

External links
 

Slovenian male single skaters
Figure skaters at the 2007 Winter Universiade
1987 births
Living people
Sportspeople from Ljubljana
Competitors at the 2009 Winter Universiade